The Xoulces is a small but abundant river in France which flows in Lorraine in the Vosges department. It is a left tributary of the Moselotte, and thus a sub-tributary of the Rhine via the Moselotte and the Moselle.

Geography
The river starts from the confluence of the Rouge Rupt and the Goutte du Grand Clos in the massif des Vosges. Its course lies entirely in the commune of Cornimont.

Hydrology
It is more than four times higher than the average for France including all basins, but also three times higher than average for the French Moselle basin,  at Hauconcourt downstream of Metz). The specific flow rate of the Xoulces thus rises to 44.9 litres per second per square kilometre of watershed.

See also
 List of rivers of France

External links

References

Rivers of Vosges (department)
Rivers of Grand Est
Rivers of France